Chris Burdon is a sound engineer. Burdon and his fellow sound engineers earned a nomination for an Academy Award for Best Sound Mixing for the 2013 film Captain Phillips. Burdon won the Academy Award for Best Sound for the 2022 film Top Gun: Maverick.

References

External links

Living people
Year of birth missing (living people)
Audio production engineers
Best Sound Mixing Academy Award winners